Somatina omicraria is a moth of the family Geometridae first described by Johan Christian Fabricius in 1798. It is found in India and Sri Lanka.

Description
Its wingspan is about 30 mm. Antennae of male with fascicles of cilia. It is a white colored moth with fuscous frons. Wings irrorated (sprinkled) with a few fuscous scales. Forewings with traces of a waved antemedial line. A large irregular rufous and fuscous ocellelus at end of cell, with a ring of bluish-silver scales on it. Hindwings with a fulvous and silver line on discocellulars. Both wings with a curved and slightly sinuous postmedial black specks series, with a series of fuscous spots, beyond series of black striae.

References

Moths described in 1798
Scopulini